Wadhwan is one of the 182 Legislative Assembly constituencies of Gujarat state in India. It is part of Surendranagar district.

List of segments
This assembly seat represents the following segments

 Wadhwan Taluka

Members of Legislative Assembly

Election results

2022

2017

2012

2007

2002

See also
 List of constituencies of the Gujarat Legislative Assembly
 Surendranagar district

References

External links
 

Assembly constituencies of Gujarat
Surendranagar district
Year of establishment missing